Hans Wagener (22 May 1931 – 20 September 2021) was a Dutch field hockey player. He competed in the men's tournament at the 1960 Summer Olympics.

References

External links
 

1931 births
2021 deaths
Dutch male field hockey players
Olympic field hockey players of the Netherlands
Field hockey players at the 1960 Summer Olympics
Sportspeople from Hilversum